Ericeia amplipennis is a moth in the  family Erebidae. It is found in Indonesia (Seram).

References

Moths described in 1922
Ericeia